The Collectors Club, often referred to as the Collectors Club of New York, is a private club and philatelic society in New York City. Founded in 1896, it is one of the oldest existing philatelic societies in the United States. Its stated purpose is "to further the study of philately, promote the hobby and provide a social, educational, and non-commercial setting for the enthusiastic enjoyment of our common passion".

In its building at 22 East 35th Street in Manhattan, the club maintains a philatelic library of approximately 150,000 volumes which are available for research or study by scholars, historians, and philatelists. The Collectors Club Philatelist, published by the club since 1922, is currently published bi-monthly and contains scholarly articles on philatelic subjects.

Clubhouse
The club is located in a five-story brownstone at 22 East 35th Street between Madison and Park Avenues in the Murray Hill neighborhood of Manhattan, New York City.  It was originally the house of Thomas and Fanny Clarke and was built in 1901–02, designed by the firm of McKim, Mead & White, with Stanford White as the partner in charge. The architecture is a combination of Colonial Revival style with medieval-inspired windows which recall those of Richard Norman Shaw, the avant-garde British architect of the late 19th century.

The building was purchased by the Collectors Club in 1937, and was designated a New York City landmark on September 11, 1979.

Members
The Collectors Club membership of over 750 includes stamp collectors from the tri-state area of New York, New Jersey, and Connecticut, as well as members elsewhere in the United States and in other countries.

Many prominent and world-famous philatelists have been members, including:  Alfred F. Lichtenstein,  Harry Lindquist,  John Luff,  John Walter Scott of Scott catalogue fame, Lawrence L. Shenfield, John J. Britt and  Theodore E. Steinway. Prominent stamp collectors named as honorary members include Franklin D. Roosevelt and the 26th Earl of Crawford.

Awards
The Alfred F. Lichtenstein Memorial Award for Distinguished Service to Philately, established in 1952 in honor of Alfred F. Lichtenstein, is an award issued annually by the club to a living individual for outstanding service to philately.

See also
 Collectors Club of Chicago
 List of American gentlemen's clubs
 List of New York City Designated Landmarks in Manhattan from 14th to 59th Streets
 National Register of Historic Places listings in New York County, New York

References
Notes

External links

 
 Collectors Club video channel Vimeo

Clubs and societies in New York City
New York City Designated Landmarks in Manhattan
McKim, Mead & White buildings
Murray Hill, Manhattan
Philatelic organizations based in the United States
Gentlemen's clubs in New York City